Chantal Kopf (born 20 March 1995) is a German politician of the Alliance 90/The Greens who has been serving as a member of the Bundestag after the 2021 German federal election. representing the electoral district of Freiburg.

Early career
During her studies, Kopf managed the Freiburg office of Kerstin Andreae.

Political career
In the negotiations to form a coalition government under the leadership of Minister-President of Baden-Württemberg Winfried Kretschmann following the 2021 state elections, Kopf was part of the working group on European and international affairs, led by Theresa Schopper and Daniel Caspary.

In parliament, Kopf serves on the Committee on European Affairs. In addition to her committee assignments, she has been a member of the German delegation to the Franco-German Parliamentary Assembly since 2022. She is also part of the German-Swiss Parliamentary Friendship Group.

References

External links 
 

Living people
1995 births
People from Baden-Baden
21st-century German politicians
21st-century German women politicians
Members of the Bundestag for Alliance 90/The Greens
Members of the Bundestag 2021–2025
Female members of the Bundestag
University of Freiburg alumni